A beer mile is a  drinking race combining running and speed drinking. Typically, the race takes place on a standard 400-metre or 1/4-mile running track. The race begins at the 1-mile starting line with the consumption of a  beer, followed by a full lap around the track. The second lap continues in a similar manner; another 12-ounce beer is consumed before commencing the running of the second lap. This process is repeated for the next two laps. Following the completion of the fourth running lap (and four beers), a competitor has finished the race.

In North America, 12 US ounces of beer are consumed from a can or bottle before every lap. A set of rules has been defined and published by BeerMile.com.

The current world record holder is Canadian Corey Bellemore, who won his third world title on October 23, 2021, with a time of 4:28.1. He broke his own record of 4:33.6, which he set in San Francisco in 2017.

History
In 1997, Seanna Robinson, a resident of Toronto, set the female beer mile record at an event held in Hamilton, Ontario. Her time of 6:42.0 stood as the women's world record until 2014, when Chris Kimbrough, a 44-year-old mother of six, ran the beer mile in 6:28.6.

James Nielsen was the first participant to break the five-minute barrier in 2014. Since then, the record has been lowered a handful of times by runners from all over the world.

2014
In 2014, the inaugural Beer Mile World Championship was held in Austin, Texas. The men's race was won by Canadian Corey Gallagher with a time of 5:00.23. In the women's race, American Beth Herndon set a new world record with a time of 6:17.8.

2015
On July 30, 2015, Australian Josh Harris (4:56.2) broke James Nielsen's world record. Harris became the second man to break the 5 minute barrier. The record lasted less than 12 hours. By the end of the day, Lewis Kent of Canada ran a 4:55.78. On August 12, the last four world record holders competed against each other for the first time. Canadian Jim Finlayson, another former world record holder, finished third overall, behind Kent and American Brian Anderson.

Canada won the men's Kingston Cup. Nielsen was disqualified for excessive spillage. Nielsen's disqualification was the deciding factor in the Canadian men's victory, turning the 10–11 American victory into a 10–11 Canadian win. The American women won the Queens cup, with Caitlin Judd, Chris Kimbrough and Lindsay Harper taking the top 3 spots. The 2nd Annual FloTrack Beer Mile World Championship was held in Austin, Texas on December 1, 2015. Kent set a new world record with a time of 4:47.17 and Gallagher finished with a time of 4:48.62.

2016
On July 31, 2016, Canadian Corey Bellemore broke the world record in London with a time of 4:34.35. Dale Clutterbuck finished second, breaking the European record with a time of 4:47:39 and Lewis Kent finished fourth in 5:11. Canada won the men's team champion, and the North American women beat the European English team for the Queen's cup. The women's race was won by Erin O'Mara, with the British and European record going to Polly Keen of England.

2017
The third annual classic was held again in London in 2017, with the American men winning the first three positions to take home the Kingston Cup. All three American men were current or former American record holders, with Chris Robertson winning over Dale Clutterbuck. Garrett Cullen earned the silver, and Brandon Shirk earned the bronze for the second straight year. Bryony Pearce was the winner, after Allison Grace Morgan and Laura Riche were disqualified, making England the winner of the Queens Cup.

On October 28, 2017, Corey Bellemore broke his own record in San Francisco with a time of 4:33.6 The event had the largest crowd for a beer mile with an estimated attendance of 6200. Bellemore's performance likely would have been faster, but he had to move out to lane 3 each lap due to soccer benches in the first 2 lanes

2018
Dale Clutterbuck was the official winner with a time of 4:50. Three runners were disqualified, including the previous year's winner Corey Bellemore, after race officials measured the remaining liquid in the cans and bottles of the 20 competitors. According to Patrick Butler of Beermile.com,  is the maximum amount allowed left over.
Bellemore was disqualified for  more than the permitted amount.

Defunct race series
Two national race series emerged and quickly folded, the Brew Mile and the National Beer Mile.  By the end of 2016, neither race series was solvent, with the National Beer Mile closing operations under dubious circumstances.

In 2017, the Flotrack Beer Mile World Championships also ceased to exist.

Other races involving alcohol

Kastenlauf
Kastenlauf (short for "Bierkastenlauf", literally "beer crate running"), Kistenlauf, Bierlauf, Bierkastenrennen (literally crate-running, beer crate-running, or equivalents), Bier-Rallye, or Bierathlon, is a drinking sport in the German-speaking countries Austria, Germany and Switzerland. It is a race among teams that consist of two people carrying a crate of beer, all of which must be consumed prior to crossing the finish line.

Marathon du Médoc
The Marathon du Médoc, held in Bordeaux every September, is a marathon through the vineyards of Médoc during which competitors sample 23 different wines as they go. It has been described as "the world's longest, booziest, race" as well as the "world's most idiotic marathon".

See also
Beer pong
Beerdarts

References

External links
Beer Mile

Drinking culture
Beer culture
Mile races
Novelty running